Vasyl Mykolayovych Kurko (born 25 April 1995) is a Ukrainian professional footballer who plays as a centre-back for Ukrainian Premier League club Veres Rivne.

References

External links
 
 

1995 births
Living people
People from Chornomorsk
Ukrainian footballers
Association football defenders
FC Chornomorets Odesa players
FC Metalist Kharkiv players
FC Zhemchuzhyna Odesa players
FC Volyn Lutsk players
FC Prykarpattia Ivano-Frankivsk (1998) players
FC Livyi Bereh Kyiv players
NK Veres Rivne players
Ukrainian Premier League players
Ukrainian First League players
Ukrainian Second League players
Ukrainian Amateur Football Championship players